This is a list of the squads picked for the 2014 ICC World Twenty20.

Squads

Coach:  Kabir Khan

Coach:  Shane Jurgensen

Coach:  Charlie Burke

Coach:  Pubudu Dassanayake

Coach:  Phil Simmons

Coach:  Anton Roux

Coach:  Aaqib Javed

Coach:  Andy Waller

Coach:  Ashley Giles

Coach:  Mike Hesson

Coach:  Russell Domingo

Coach:  Paul Farbrace

Coach:  Darren Lehmann

Coach:  Rahul Dravid

Coach:  Moin Khan

Coach:  Ottis Gibson

Changes
English batsman Joe Root broke his right thumb in the third ODI against the West Indies and was ruled out of the tournament, being replaced by Ian Bell. English all-rounder Ben Stokes damaged his hand by punching a locker in the dressing room after he was dismissed in the third T20I against the West Indies. He was replaced by Chris Woakes. Australian bowler Mitchell Johnson missed the tournament with an infection in his toe. He was replaced by Doug Bollinger.

Nepalese all-rounder Prithu Baskota was suffering from a knee injury, which he picked up during the 2014 World Cup Qualifier in New Zealand and was replaced by his teammate Amrit Bhattarai. On 16 March, Avinash Karn was replaced by Anil Mandal after Karn suffered an injury to his right knee and, therefore, was ruled out of the tournament.

On 16 March, Dutch batsman Tim Gruijters was replaced by Tom Cooper—previously unavailable for the tournament due to domestic commitments with Australian state side South Australia—with the Dutch coaching staff stating that Gruijters was injured. However, Gruijters denied that he was injured and alleged that the "coaching staff decided to bend the rules, act against the spirit of cricket and basically cheat". However, the ICC confirmed that they were satisfied that the KNCB had complied with the rules of the tournament.

On 22 March, English all-rounder Luke Wright was ruled out of the tournament due to a side-strain. He was replaced by Craig Kieswetter.

See also
 2014 ICC Women's World Twenty20 squads

References

External links
2014 ICC World Twenty20 squads on ESPN CricInfo

2014 ICC World Twenty20
Cricket squads
ICC Men's T20 World Cup squads